That Kind of Woman is a 1959 American drama film directed by Sidney Lumet, who was nominated for the Golden Bear at the 9th Berlin International Film Festival. It stars Sophia Loren and Tab Hunter. The screenplay by Walter Bernstein, based on a short story by Robert Lowry ("Layover in El Paso"), is highly reminiscent of the 1938 film The Shopworn Angel.

The Paramount Pictures release was filmed on location in New York City and Long Beach, New York.

Plot
The film is set in New York City in June 1944, during World War II. Kay is a sophisticated Italian woman, the mistress of a Manhattan millionaire industrialist known simply as The Man, who uses her to help him influence his contacts at The Pentagon. While en route from Miami to New York City by train, she and her friend Jane meet a considerably younger American paratrooper named Red and his sergeant George Kelly, and Kay and Red fall into a romantic relationship. Eventually the woman finds herself torn between her upscale life in a Sutton Place apartment and the prospect of true love with the GI.

Principal cast
Sophia Loren as Kay 
Tab Hunter as Red
George Sanders as "The Man", A.L.
Jack Warden as George Kelly
Barbara Nichols as Jane 
Keenan Wynn as Harry Corwin

Principal production credits
Producers ..... Carlo Ponti, Marcello Girosi
Original Music ..... Daniele Amfitheatrof
Cinematography ..... Boris Kaufman
Art Direction ..... Hal Pereira, Roland Anderson 
Costume Design ..... Edith Head
Makeup ..... Wally Westmore

Critical reception
In his review in The New York Times, Bosley Crowther stated, "Walter Bernstein's screen play is a breezy, banal and bumptious thing, and Sidney Lumet has directed it with so many close-ups that it looks like a travesty of a 'silent' style."

References

External links
 That Kind of Woman at the Internet Movie Database
 

1959 films
1959 romantic drama films
American black-and-white films
American romantic drama films
Films based on short fiction
Films directed by Sidney Lumet
Films produced by Carlo Ponti
Films scored by Daniele Amfitheatrof
Films set in 1944
Films set in Miami
Films set in New York City
Films set on the home front during World War II
Films shot in New York (state)
Films shot in New York City
Films with screenplays by Walter Bernstein
Paramount Pictures films
1950s English-language films
1950s American films